Hoholeve is an urban-type settlement in Myrhorod Raion of Poltava Oblast in Ukraine. Hoholeve hosts the administration of Hoholeve settlement hromada, one of the hromadas of Ukraine. Population: 

Until 18 July 2020, Hoholeve belonged to Velyka Bahachka Raion. The raion was abolished in July 2020 as part of the administrative reform of Ukraine, which reduced the number of raions of Poltava Oblast to four. The area of Velyka Bahachka Raion was merged into Myrhorod Raion.

Economy

Transportation
Hoholeve railway station is on the railway connecting Poltava with Romodan with further connections to Kyiv via Hrebinka, Bakhmach, and Kremenchuk. There is infrequent passenger traffic.

The settlement has roas access to Myrhorod, Poltava, and Lubny.

References

Urban-type settlements in Myrhorod Raion